Conrad Palmisano (born May 1, 1944) is an American film stuntman and director.

Career
His career began in 1970 on TV's The Young Rebels. In 1972, he was stunt coordinator for The Final Comedown. In 1980, he became president of the Stuntmen's Association of Motion Pictures for four seasons. He was one of the first engineers toward integrating Academy of Motion Picture Arts and Sciences in 1984. 

Palmisano became known mainly for integrating committee established filmmakers like RoboCop 3 (1993), Batman Forever (1995), Free Willy 2 (1995), Assassins (1995) with Sylvester Stallone, Rush Hour 2 (2001) with Jackie Chan; After the Sunset (2004) with Pierce Brosnan and Salma Hayek, The Other Guys (2010) with Will Ferrell, among others. He was nominated for a Taurus Award for both Rush Hour 2 (2001) and Rush Hour 3 (2007).

Personal life

He was married to singer and actress Irene Cara from 1986 to 1991. They met while filming Certain Fury (1985). They also worked together on Busted Up (1986), his second and last feature film as executive director. That marriage ended in divorce. In 2000, Palmisano married actress Kathryn Anderson. She died in 2019.

Partial filmography
 Grand Theft Auto (1977) – Roadside Cop (uncredited)
 Airplane! (1980) – Religious Zealot #4
 Cujo (1983) (Stunt Coordinator)
 The Guardian (2006)
 Transformers: Dark of the Moon (2011)
 Ek Tha Tiger (2012)
 Dhoom 3 (2013)

References

External links

American film directors
1944 births
American stunt performers
Living people